Jozef Karel (13 September 1922 in Humenné – 26 September 2005 in Košice) was a Slovak football player and coach. A midfielder, he played for SAC Sečovce, Snaha Košice, Slávia Prešov, ŠK Bratislava and shortly for Red Star Saint-Ouen on a loan. He was selected to the France Football Top 20 Midfielders on the World in 1965.

Karel made one appearance for the First Slovak Republic in 1944 and seven appearances for the Czechoslovakia national team.

He started his managing career in Piešťany where he spent two years and he went on with his work in Prešov, Jednota Košice (he led to the First League), Slavoj Trebišov, Martin, C.D. Saprissa (he won the title) and Kuwait.

References

External links
Jozef Karel at The Football Association of the Czech Republic

1922 births
2005 deaths
Sportspeople from Humenné
Slovak footballers
Czechoslovak footballers
Association football midfielders
Slovakia international footballers
Czechoslovakia international footballers
Dual internationalists (football)
ŠK Slovan Bratislava players
Red Star F.C. players
Deportivo Saprissa managers
Slovak football managers
FC VSS Košice managers
Czechoslovak football managers
1. FC Tatran Prešov managers
Czechoslovak expatriate footballers
Czechoslovak expatriate football managers
Czechoslovak expatriate sportspeople in France
Expatriate footballers in France
Expatriate football managers in Costa Rica